Burned Alive by Time is the second full-length album released by melodic hardcore band Evergreen Terrace. Originally released in 2002, the album was re-released on vinyl LP in 2009 via the Grand Rapids, Michigan-based label Mind Over Matter Records.

Track listing

Note
"Heavy Number One (aka: Shizzle My Nizzle)" contains a hidden cover track, "Enjoy the Silence" originally by Depeche Mode.

Personnel
Andrew Carey – lead vocals
Craig Chaney – lead guitar, clean vocals
Josh James – rhythm guitar, backing vocals
Jason Southwell – bass guitar
Christopher Brown – drums

Cultural references
The band is infamous for referring to pop culture in their titles, lyrics, and soundbites.

References

Evergreen Terrace albums
2002 albums
Eulogy Recordings albums
Albums produced by Jeremy Staska
Mind Over Matter Records albums